Montague Macgregor Grover (31 May 1870 – 7 March 1943), commonly referred to as "Monty Grover", was an Australian journalist, editor of the Sydney Sun.

History
Grover was born in Melbourne, son of Harry (c. 1830–1918) and Jessie Grover (died 1906) of St Kilda, Victoria, and was educated at Queen's College, St Kilda and Melbourne Church of England Grammar School.

In 1888 he was articled to a Melbourne firm of architects but when he emerged four years later the country was in a severe recession, with little chance of employment, so turned to journalism.
 
In 1894 he worked for the short-lived unionist newspaper The Boomerang; later that year he joined the literary staff of Melbourne's The Age.
He transferred to the "Argus" in 1896.

In 1902 he visited London as secretary to J. C. Williamson.

Sydney
He was sub-editor of the Sydney Morning Herald 1907 to 1910, and while on that newspaper was responsible for Australia's first bold headlines.

In 1910 Hugh Denison purchased the Australian Newspaper Company, whose publications included Sydney's old and ailing evening  Sun (until 1909 The Australian Star) and the Sunday Sun, aiming to oust the Evening News as the top afternoon paper, and appointed Grover editor-in-chief. 
He served as The Sun'''s representative in London 1918–1921.
Grover has been credited with "discovering" Jimmy Bancks, whose Us Fellers was first published in the "Sunbeams" section of the Sunday Sun, thus introducing Ginger Meggs to millions of young Australians.

Return to Melbourne
In 1922 he returned to Melbourne with the intention of founding the Evening Sun in competition with The Herald, but had some problems with an overseas cable contract, so in the interim founded the Sun Pictorial. In 1924 Denison sold The Sun and Sun Pictorial to Keith Murdoch, who promptly combined the two institutions.
He was 1929–1930 he was magazine editor for the Herald and later made a tour of the world, contributing articles to the Herald and Sun.

In 1931–1932, he edited The World a (labour) Sydney afternoon daily. He also served for a time as Melbourne editor of The Bulletin.

Around 1939 he made a tour of the western districts of New South Wales and Victoria, writing articles for Smith's Weekly on some of the regional towns, including Camperdown and Cobden.

He died at his home on Alexandra Avenue, South Yarra. The ceremony at Springvale Crematorium was attended by many journalists and newspapermen, including G. A. Kennedy, Watkin Wynne, Vance Palmer, R. H. Croll, and R. W. E. Wilmot.

Tribute
There have been many brilliant writers produced by this country during that time, but not one has been as versatile, nor recognised so universally as outstanding. Not a man who worked under him, and there have been thousands, ever had anything but praise for his leadership, all were inspired by his keenness for a good story, they loved his sense of humor, his outright honesty, and his insatiable appetite for scoops. He knew what the public wanted, when they picked up a newspaper and human interest stories were always featured in the papers he edited.
The annual Montague Grover memorial prize competition for cadet journalists was named for him.

PublicationsThe Sleeping Beauty and the Beast (1903)The Minus Quantity and Other Short Plays (1914)Judah and the Giant (1915)The Time Is Now Ripe (1937), a (socialist) economic thesisHold Page One (1993), memoirs
some verses by Grover were included inThe Australian Favourite Reciter, W. T. Pyke, ed. (1907)The 'Bulletin' book of Humorous Verse and Recitations (1920)

Family
Grover married twice; to Ada Goldberg (1877–1928) in 1897, divorced 1910, and in 1915 to Regina Varley, daughter of Edward Varley. He had three sons and four daughters, including:
Harry Grover, on the staff of the Herald and A.I.F. Newsdaughter married Arthur Cannon. She was on the staff of The Argus''.
Moira Grover married William L. Sayle in 1927
Junee Grover (1909–1984) married Alex Gurney on 16 June 1928

Further reading

Notes and references 

1870 births
1943 deaths
Australian newspaper editors
Journalists from Melbourne
People from St Kilda, Victoria
People educated at Melbourne Grammar School